Patrick Smythe may refer to:

Pat Smythe (priest) (1860–1935), Scottish priest
Pat Smythe (pianist) (1923–1983), Scottish jazz pianist

See also
Pat Smythe (1928–1996), British show jumper
Patrick Smyth (disambiguation)
Patrick Smith (disambiguation)